Refugium Peccatorum Madonna or the Refuge of Sinners Madonna is a painting by the Italian artist Luigi Crosio. It was painted in 1898.

Crosio originally painted the Madonna for the Kuenzil Brothers in Switzerland. In 1964 the Swiss province of the Schoenstatt Sisters purchased the original painting. It was then also called the Mother Thrice Admirable Madonna.

Sources
 Research on Luigi Crosio
 University of Dayton 

1898 paintings
Paintings of the Madonna and Child
Paintings in Switzerland